This is a list of fossiliferous stratigraphic units in Venezuela.

List of fossiliferous stratigraphic units

See also 

 
 Gomphothere fossils in Venezuela
 List of fossiliferous stratigraphic units in Colombia
 List of fossiliferous stratigraphic units in Curaçao
 List of fossiliferous stratigraphic units in Guyana
 List of fossiliferous stratigraphic units in Trinidad and Tobago
 South American land mammal ages

References

Bibliography 
Cantaure & Paraguaná Formations
 

Capadare Formation
 
 

Castillo Formation
 
 
 
 
 
 

Chaguaramas Formation
 

Mesa Formation
 

Parángula Formation
 

Río Yuca Formation
 

San Gregorio Formation
 
 

Santa Inés Formation
 

Urumaco, Socorro & Codore Formations

Further reading 
Paleozoic
 C.M. Berry and W.E. Stein. 2000. A New Iridopteridalean from the Devonian of Venezuela. International Journal of Plant Sciences 161:807-827
 C. M. Berry and D. Edwards. 1995. New species of the lycophyte Colpodexylon Banks from the Devonian of Venezuela. Palaeontographica Abteilung B 237:59-74
 C. M. Berry. 1994. First record of the Devonian lycophyte Leclercquia from South America. Geological Magazine 131(2):269-272
 A. J. Boucot, J. L. Benedetto, Y. Grahn, J. H. G. Melo, T. M. Sanchez and B. A. Waisfeld. 1999. South American marine Silurian communities. In A. J. Boucot and J. D. Lawson (eds.), Paleocommunities—a case study from the Silurian and Lower Devonian 841-848
 E. A. Frederickson. 1958. Lower Tremadocian trilobite from Venezuela. Journal of Paleontology 32(3):541-543
 P.R. Hoover. 1981. Paleontology, Taphonomy, and Paleoecology of the Palmarito Formation (Permian of Venezuela). Bulletins of American Paleontology 80(313):1-138
 O. Odreman-Rivas and R. H. Wagner. 1979. Precisiones sobre algunas floras Carboniferas Permicas de los Andes Venezolanos. Boletin de Geologia 13:77-79
 T. M. Sanchez. 1983. A new Permian ophiuroid, Archaeophiomusium andinum nov sp from western Venezuela. Geobios 16:103-107
 M. L. Thompson and A. K. Miller. 1949. Permian fusulinids and cephalopods from the vicinity of the Maracaibo basin in northern South America. Journal of Paleontology 23:1-32

Mesozoic
 E. H. Colbert. 1949. A new Cretaceous plesiosaur from Venezuela. American Museum Novitates 1420:1-22
 C. Gonzalez de Juana, J. Iturralde de Arozena, and X.P. Cadillat. 1980. Geologia de Venezuela y de sus cuencas petroliferas. 1:162-166
 E. von der Osten. 1957. A fauna from the lower Cretaceous Barranquin Formation of Venezuela. Journal of Paleontology 31(3):571-590
 O. Renz. 1982. The Cretaceous ammonites of Venezuela 1-132
 J. W. Wells. 1944. Cretaceous, tertiary, and recent corals, a sponge, and an alga from Venezuela. Journal of Paleontology 18(5):429-447

External links 
 

.Venezuela
 
 
Fossiliferous stratigraphic units
Fossil